Ponte de Sor, Tramaga e Vale de Açor is one of the parishes located in Ponte de Sor Municipality, Portugal. The population in 2011 was 11,198, in an area of 331.71 km2.

References

Freguesias of Ponte de Sor